is a railway station in the town of Takahama, Ōi District, Fukui Prefecture, Japan, operated by West Japan Railway Company (JR West).

Lines

Station layout
The station consists of one side platform serving a single bi-directional track. The station is staffed.

Adjacent stations

History
Aonogō Station opened on 1 November 1940.  With the privatization of Japanese National Railways (JNR) on 1 April 1987, the station came under the control of JR West. The station building was rebuilt in 2005 in a log-cabin style.

Passenger statistics
In fiscal 2016, the station was used by an average of 134 passengers daily (boarding passengers only).

Surrounding area

 Aonogō Elementary School

See also
 List of railway stations in Japan

References

External links

  

Railway stations in Fukui Prefecture
Stations of West Japan Railway Company
Railway stations in Japan opened in 1940
Obama Line
Takahama, Fukui